Birkdale is a coastal locality in the City of Redland, Queensland, Australia.

Geography
Birkdale stretches from Tingalpa Creek in the west, the border with Brisbane City, to Wellington Point in the east. Thorneside and Waterloo Bay are to its north, and Capalaba and Alexandra Hills to its south.

The Cleveland railway line enters the locality from the north-west (Thorneside) and exits to the east (Wellington Point) with the locality being served by the Birkdale railway station.

Major features are a canal style housing development known as Aquatic Paradise, a significant shopping precinct located near Aquatic Paradise and a retirement village known as Wellington Manor.

There are two neighbourhoods in the locality:

 Poudalandyalbetser.

 Tanganghur

It is also home to one of the Redlands Waste Transfer Stations, which (as of July 2012) is provided to the residents of the city free of charge. It encourages residents to recycle such items as green waste, cardboard etc. and helps in the proper disposal of hazardous materials.

The Redland Whitewater Centre is to be built in the Birkdale Community Precinct for use in white-water canoeing events at the 2032 Summer Olympics.

History 

The name Birkdale comes from Birkdale House in Roger Street,  the home of settler and vigneron James Baron. It was used as the name of the railway station constructed in 1889.

William Thorne was another early local land owner.

Birkdale State School opened on 27 November 1916 with 28 students.

In the 1920s, poultry was a major industry in Birkdale.

Mary MacKillop Catholic Primary School opened on 20 April 1997.

Birkdale South State School opened on 25 January 1982.

The median age of the Birkdale population was 39 years, 2 years above the national median of 37. 75.2% of people living in Birkdale were born in Australia. The other top responses for country of birth were England 5.8%, New Zealand 4.9%, South Africa 1.3%, Netherlands 1.2%, Scotland 0.8%. 90% of people spoke only English at home; the next most common languages were 1.1% Dutch, 0.5% German, 0.5% Mandarin, 0.4% Vietnamese, 0.4% Italian.

Heritage listing 
There is one heritage listing in Birkdale, the School of Arts Hall on 101 Birkdale Road.

Education

Birkdale State School is a government primary (Prep-6) school for boys and girls at 74 Agnes Street (corner of Birkdale Road). In 2017, the school had an enrolment of 646 students, predominantly drawn from the suburbs of Thorneside and Birkdale, with 43 teachers (39 full-time equivalent) and 20 non-teaching staff (15 full-time equivalent). In 2018, the school had an enrolment of 629 students with 43 teachers (39 full-time equivalent) and 19 non-teaching staff (15 full-time equivalent). It includes a special education program. 

Birkdale South State School is a government primary (Prep-6) school for boys and girls at 451 Old Cleveland Road East. In 2017, the school had an enrolment of 583 students with 44 teachers (37 full-time equivalent) and 19 non-teaching staff (14 full-time equivalent). The school's catchment area has transitioned from small crop farms to residential estates. In 2018, the school had an enrolment of 583 students with 46 teachers (39 full-time equivalent) and 25 non-teaching staff (17 full-time equivalent). It includes a special education program.

St Mary MacKillop Primary School is a Catholic primary (Prep-6) school for boys and girls at 10 Hardy Road. In 2018, the school had an enrolment of 576 students with 39 teachers (34 full-time equivalent) and 26 non-teaching staff (16 full-time equivalent).

There are no secondary schools in Birkdale. The nearest government secondary schools are Wellington Point State High School in neighbouring Wellington Point to the east (on the boundary with Birkdale) and Alexandra Hills State High School in neighbouring Alexandra Hills to the south-east.

Transport

Birkdale railway station provides access to regular Queensland Rail City network services to Brisbane and Cleveland.

Sporting clubs
Birkdale Mud Crabs Cricket Club
Bayside Ravens Gridiron Club
Redlands Rugby Union Club

Youth organisations
Birkdale Scout Group

Parks 
There are a number of parks in the locality:

 Aquatic Paradise Park
 Bailey Road Park

 Birkdale Bushland Refuge

 Birkdale Fodder Forest

 Bynd Road Park

 Byng Road Park

 Creek Road Park

 Howeston Golf Course

 Judy Holt Sportsfield

 Mary Street Park

 Pine Forest Park

 Pitstachio Court Park

 Quarry Road Park

 Tarradarrapin Wetlands

 The Frederick Radunza Reserve

 Three Paddocks Park

 Tingalpa Creek Reserve

 Valantine Park

 William Taylor Park

Climate 
Birkdale has a humid subtropical climate (Köppen climate classification Cfa) with hot, humid summers and mild winters. From November through March, thunderstorms are common, with the more severe events accompanied by large damaging hail stones, torrential rain and destructive winds.

Notable citizens 
 Peter Airley (1865-1950), school teacher, politician and writer
 Wally Lewis (01/12/59-), Rugby League player, sports presenter
 Mirusia Louwerse (29 March 1985 -), opera singer
 George Randall (1843-1930), confectionery manufacturer, migration officer and orchardist

References

External links

Birkdale History - Redland City Council
 University of Queensland: Queensland Places: Birkdale
 Redlands Tourism

Suburbs of Redland City
Coastline of Queensland
Localities in Queensland